is a passenger railway station in located in the city of Hashimoto, Wakayama Prefecture, Japan, operated by West Japan Railway Company (JR West).

Lines
Shimohyōgo Station is served by the Wakayama Line, and is located 43.2 kilometers from the terminus of the line at Ōji Station.

Station layout
The station consists of one side platform serving a single bidirectional track. There is no station building, but only a small weather shelter. The station is unattended.

Adjacent stations

|-
!colspan=5|West Japan Railway Company

History
Shimohyōgo Station opened on October 1, 1968. With the privatization of the Japan National Railways (JNR) on April 1, 1987, the station came under the aegis of the West Japan Railway Company.

Passenger statistics
In fiscal 2019, the station was used by an average of 126 passengers daily (boarding passengers only).

Surrounding Area
 Koyaguchi Park
Wakayama Prefectural Ito Chuo High School

See also
List of railway stations in Japan

References

External links

 0621837 Shimohyōgo Station Official Site

Railway stations in Wakayama Prefecture
Railway stations in Japan opened in 1968
Hashimoto, Wakayama